Verónica Isbej (born 17 November 1976) is a Chilean biathlete. She competed in two events at the 2006 Winter Olympics.

References

1976 births
Living people
Biathletes at the 2006 Winter Olympics
Chilean female biathletes
Olympic biathletes of Chile
Place of birth missing (living people)